The Big Move is a regional transportation plan (RTP) published in 2008 and consisting of 62 rapid transit projects to be implemented across the Greater Toronto and Hamilton Area (GTHA). These rapid transit projects are intended to form a seamlessly integrated regional rapid transit network, which is the first priority action in the regional transportation plan. These projects form two long-term templates with 15 and 25 year horizons. These templates outline broad projects; specific details about technology, alignment, stations and service levels for each project are subsequently determined though a cost–benefit analysis or an environmental assessment process.

List of projects

Implementation

GO Transit Regional Express Rail

Regional Express Rail is a project to improve GO Transit train service by adding all-day, two-way service to the Barrie line and the inner portions of the Kitchener line and the Stouffville line, and by increasing frequency of train service on various lines to as often as every 15 minutes on five of the corridors. This would be achieved with the full electrification of the Lakeshore East line and the Barrie line and the electrification of the inner portions of the Lakeshore West line, the Kitchener line, the Barrie line and the Stouffville line.

Toronto

LRT projects

On September 28, 2012, Metrolinx signed a master agreement with the Toronto Transit Commission (TTC) to implement four new light rail transit lines in Toronto:
 Sheppard East LRT
 Finch West LRT
 Line 5 Eglinton
 Replacement of Line 3 Scarborough.

These projects were also identified in Transit City, a rapid transit plan announced by former Toronto Mayor David Miller and TTC Chair Adam Giambrone on March 16, 2007. After $4billion in provincial funding for Transit City from the Ontario government was deferred, the projects were rolled into a "5 in 10" plan, referring to goal of completing the four LRT lines and a BRT line in ten years. The plan also included the purchase of 182 light rail vehicles from Bombardier Transportation.

In December 2010, Rob Ford, who succeeded David Miller as mayor, announced his intention to cancel key parts of Transit City, saying "we will not build any more rail tracks down the middle of our streets." However, he was open to the Eglinton Crosstown LRT, given that it is primarily underground. Ford acknowledged that he will need council's support to put an end to Transit City. In early 2012, Toronto City Council voted in favour of motions to resume work on the Sheppard, Eglinton and Finch LRT lines, and on replacing the Scarborough RT, defeating Rob Ford's campaign for subways.

The subway debate has continued in regards to the replacement of Line 3 Scarborough. Toronto City Council voted in June 2013 for a proposal to build the Scarborough Subway Extension. In light of this, Metrolinx threatened to stop work on Scarborough rapid transit, or even walk away from the project. Meanwhile, the Minister of Transportation Glen Murray was open to a modified project, as long as any costs that were additional to what the province originally committed. In September 2013, the Government of Ontario announced it would build a subway, but it would terminate at Scarborough Centre station, and consist of "a minimum" of two stops. The City of Toronto has moved forward with planning an extension of Line 2 Bloor–Danforth in Scarborough.

Subway projects
On November 29, 2012, Metrolinx CEO Bruce McCuaig announced two subway projects for Toronto region that would be pursued in the upcoming 15 years:

 Relief Line
 Yonge North subway extension

A TTC study was completed in 2012 to address existing capacity constraints on the existing Yonge subway and GO Transit lines. The study projected even with planned improvements on both networks, significant capacity issues would remain by 2031, recommending that a Downtown Relief Line be completed prior to the Yonge subway extension. The Big Move initially ranked the downtown relief line as lower priority, for completion within a 25-year time frame, and Metrolinx Chair Rob MacIsaac stated in 2008 that the line is unlikely to be brought forward from its projected 2020 start date. By March 2012, TTC CEO Andy Byford stressed there was great need for additional subway capacity with the increasing rate of population growth in Toronto, and capacity issues along Line 1 Yonge–University, stating "The downtown relief line has got to be looked at and has got to be talked about right now." Metrolinx accordingly stated that capacity issues may allow the DRL to be given higher priority in The Big Move, which was made official with the Phase 2 announcement.

Peel Region

The Hurontario LRT in Mississauga and Brampton will represent a replacement of existing express bus services offered by MiWay and Züm. The line will run from Steeles Avenue in the north to Port Credit in the south. This will allow connections to GO Transit's Milton and Lakeshore West lines, and bus terminals at Brampton Gateway, Mississauga City Centre, Square One, and Mississauga Hospital. The LRT was planned to extend further north along Main Street to Brampton GO Station, but Brampton City Council voted against this portion of the route. Construction is expected to commence in 2018, and the line is projected to enter service in 2022.

The Mississauga Transitway is another rapidway being built along Highway 403, Eastgate Parkway and Eglinton Avenue is being built in a partnership between the City of Mississauga and GO Transit. The transit corridor will run east–west across Mississauga, with all-station stop and extensive express bus service for thousands of riders per day. Construction began on the 18-kilometre segment between Winston Churchill Boulevard and Renforth Drive in August 2010. The first stretch opened between Hurontario Street and Dixie Road on November 17, 2014, with the rest of the project targeted for opening in 2016.

Hamilton
The Hamilton B-Line was identified as one of the top 15 priority projects in The Big Move, and along with the A-Line, is identified for completion within 15 years. It is also part of the larger BLAST network of rapid transit proposed for Hamilton. The first phase will see the B-Line run between McMaster University and Queenston Circle, as well as a segment of the A-Line to provide a direct connection to West Harbour GO Station, and a pedestrian corridor to the Hamilton GO Centre. Construction is expected to begin in 2019.

York Region
Metrolinx has also pursued constructing dedicated bus rapid transit (BRT) lanes, also known as "rapidways", for the Viva service in York region. Rapidways are one element of a $1.4billion investment into York region's transit. The BRT service will include connections with GO Transit, regional transit and future extensions of the TTC subway system. Over 34 kilometres of rapidways are planned, with the goal of buses arriving every 2 to 5 minutes. Construction began in December 2009, and all elements are expected to be completed by 2020.

Notes

References

External links
 The Big Move - Overview and Message from the Chair
 The Big Move - PDF
 Metrolinx - Official Site

Metrolinx
Transportation planning
Transport in Toronto
Transport in the Greater Toronto Area